McCollum v. Board of Education, 333 U.S. 203 (1948), was a landmark United States Supreme Court case related to the power of a state to use its tax-supported public school system to aid religious instruction. The case was a test of the separation of church and state with respect to education.

The case tested the principle of "released time", where public schools set aside class time for religious instruction. The Court struck down a  Champaign, Illinois program as unconstitutional because of the public school system's involvement in the administration, organization and support of religious instruction classes. The Court noted that some 2,000 communities nationwide offered similar released time programs affecting 1.5 million students.

Background
The case was brought by Vashti McCollum, the mother of a student enrolled in the Champaign public school district.

In 1940, interested members of the Protestant, Catholic, and Jewish faiths formed an association named the Champaign Council on Religious Education. This association obtained permission from the Champaign Board of Education to offer voluntary religious education classes for public school students from grades four to nine. These weekly 30- and 45-minute classes were led by clergy and lay members of the association in public school classrooms during school hours.

McCollum, an atheist, objected to the existing religious classes, stating that her son James was ostracized for not attending them. After complaints to school officials to stop offering these classes went unheeded, McCollum sued the school board in July 1945, stating that the religious instruction in the public schools violated the Establishment Clause of the First Amendment—the principle of separation of church and state in the United States. McCollum also complained that the school district's religious education classes violated the Equal Protection Clause of the Fourteenth Amendment. The principal elements of the McCollum complaint were that:

 In actual practice, certain Protestant groups exercised an advantage over other Protestant denominations.
 The school district's calling the classes "voluntary" was in name only because school officials often coerced or forced students' participation.
 The power exercised by the Champaign Council on Religious Education in its selection of instructors and the school superintendent's oversight of these instructors served to determine which religious faiths participated in the instructional program and constituted prior censorship of religion.

In her suit, McCollum asked that the Board of Education be ordered to "adopt and enforce rules and regulations prohibiting all instruction in and teaching of all religious education in all public schools in Champaign District Number 71, and in all public school houses and buildings in said district when occupied by public schools".

The Circuit Court of Champaign County ruled in favor of the school district in January 1946, and upon appeal, the Illinois Supreme Court affirmed the lower court's ruling.

Decision of the Court
McCollum sought review from the U. S. Supreme Court, which agreed to hear the case, taking oral arguments in December 1947. A number of religious groups including the American Unitarian Association, the Synagogue Council of America, the General Conference of Seventh-day Adventists and the Baptist Joint Committee of Religious Liberty filed briefs in support of McCollum's position.

On March 8, 1948, the Court ruled 8-1 in favor of McCollum, ruling that the classes were unconstitutional.

In the majority opinion, written by Justice Hugo Black, the Court held that

Dissent
The lone dissenting justice, Stanley Forman Reed, objected to the breadth of the majority's interpretation of the Establishment Clause and stated that an incidental support of religion should have been permissible with a more narrow reading of the First Amendment.

Subsequent developments
The Supreme Court's ruling remanded the case to the Illinois high court for relief consistent with the federal ruling.

The high court revisited the issue of religious instruction in Zorach v. Clauson in 1952. The 6 to 3 ruling in the later case held that a New York program allowing religious education during the school day was permissible, because it did not use public school facilities or public funds.

See also
List of United States Supreme Court cases, volume 333

References

Further reading

External links

TIME article on McCollum v. Board of Education case in circuit court, dated September 24, 1945
TIME article on Illinois Supreme Court's ruling against McCollum, dated February 10, 1947
TIME article on oral arguments before U.S. Supreme Court, dated December 22, 1947
TIME article on U.S. Supreme Court ruling in favor of McCollum, dated March 22, 1948
TIME article on theologists' views of ruling in McCollum case, dated July 19, 1948
TIME article on Catholic bishops' denunciation of Supreme Court ruling, dated November 29, 1948
PBS documentary The Lord is not on trial here today

United States Supreme Court cases
United States Supreme Court cases of the Vinson Court
Establishment Clause case law
Religion and education
United States education case law
United States equal protection case law
1948 in United States case law
1948 in religion
1948 in education
American Civil Liberties Union litigation
Education in Champaign County, Illinois